Asbury may refer to:

People
 Cory Asbury (born 1985), American Christian musician and worship pastor
 Francis Asbury (1745–1816), Methodist bishop and key figure in the development of religion in the United States
 Herbert Asbury (1889–1963), American journalist and writer
 Willie Asbury (born 1943), American football player

Places in the United States
 Asbury, Alabama
 Asbury, Dale County, Alabama
 Asbury, Iowa
 Asbury, Kentucky
 Asbury, Minnesota
 Asbury, Missouri
 Asbury, New Jersey
 Asbury Park, New Jersey
 Asbury, Stokes County, North Carolina
 Asbury, Wake County, North Carolina, in Wake County, North Carolina
 Asbury, West Virginia

Other
 Asbury (CTA station)
 Asbury Automotive Group
 Asbury College (disambiguation)
 Asbury Park (disambiguation)
 Asbury Theological Seminary, a Kentucky seminary that came out of Asbury College
 Asbury University, a Kentucky educational institution named after Bishop Francis Asbury